Salvo Cuccia (born July 14, 1960) is an Italian cinema director and screenwriter.

Filmography 
1993. Duo with Peter Kowald.
1995. Un sogno di lumaca.
2003. Il Satiro danzante.
2004. Détour De Seta.
2006. Oltre Selinunte.
2007. Rockarbëresh.
2008. Fuori Rotta.
2012. "1982 L'Estate di Frank.
2013. "Summer 82 when Zappa came to Sicily'.

 Awards 
 1995. Torino Film Festival, second prize Spazio Italia Fiction, with Un sogno di lumaca.
2005. Genova Film Festival, Best documentary film, with Détour De Seta.
2006. Torino Film Festival, CinemAvvenire Prize, Best Italian documentary film, with Oltre Selinunte''.

References

Salvo Cuccia at the Cinecittà Luce - Filmitalia.

External links
 

1960 births
Living people
Italian film directors
Film people from Palermo